Reisbach is a market town in Bavaria. It lies on the Vils River, and belongs to the administrative region of Niederbayern.

Neighbouring communities 
The neighbouring communities, listed  clockwise, are Mamming, Landau an der Isar, Simbach (bei Landau), Falkenberg (Niederbayern), Rimbach (Niederbayern), Gangkofen, Marklkofen and Gottfrieding.

Villages in the municipality
 Englmannsberg
 Griesbach
 Niederhausen
 Oberhausen
 Obermünchsdorf
 Reith
 Thannenmais

References

Dingolfing-Landau